Dovzhok is a village (a selo) in the Kamianets-Podilskyi Raion (district) of Khmelnytskyi Oblast in western Ukraine. It belongs to Kamianets-Podilskyi urban hromada, one of the hromadas of Ukraine. The village's population was 4,263 as of the 2001 Ukrainian census. Dovzhok was the administrative center of the Dovzhok Raion until December 4, 1928, when its center was moved to Kamianets-Podilskyi.

References

Famous people 
Simashkevych Mykhailo - mayor of Kamianets-Podilskyi.

Tolik - famous Python programmer and freelancer.

Villages in Kamianets-Podilskyi Raion